"Cool Water" is a song written in 1936 by Bob Nolan. It is about a parched man and his mule traveling a wasteland tormented by mirages. Members of the Western Writers of America chose it as No. 3 on the Top 100 Western songs of all time.

Charting versions
It was first recorded by The Sons of the Pioneers on March 27, 1941, for Decca Records (catalog 5939) and this briefly charted in 1941 with a peak position of No. 25.  However, the best-selling recorded version was done by Vaughn Monroe and The Sons of the Pioneers in 1948. The recording was released by RCA Victor as catalog number 20-2923. The record was on the Billboard chart for 13 weeks beginning on August 6, 1948, peaking at No. 9. The Sons of the Pioneers also recorded the song without Monroe, again for RCA Victor.

Frankie Laine and The Mellomen took it to No. 2 on the British charts in 1955.

Film appearances
1945 Along the Navajo Trail - sung by Bob Nolan and the Sons of the Pioneers.
1945 Saddle Serenade - performed by Jimmy Wakely and the Riders of the Purple Sage
1946 Ding Dong Williams performed by Bob Nolan and the Sons of the Pioneers. 
2011 Rango - performed by Hank Williams.
2014 Lost River - sung by Ben Mendelsohn with music by Johnny Jewel
2018 The Ballad of Buster Scruggs - sung by Tim Blake Nelson

Charts
Frankie Laine version

References

External links
 Bob Nolan website
 Courtney Jaye and Peter Hayes
 

Songs about cowboys and cowgirls
1936 songs
1941 singles
Western music (North America)
1948 songs
Vaughn Monroe songs
Burl Ives songs
Sons of the Pioneers songs
Fleetwood Mac songs
Bob Dylan songs
Johnnie Ray songs
Frankie Laine songs
Grammy Hall of Fame Award recipients
Songs written by Bob Nolan